FabricLive.14 is a DJ mix compilation album by DJ Spinbad, as part of the FabricLive Mix Series.

Track listing
  DJ Spinbad – Intro
  Lord Tariq & Peter Gunz – Déjà Vu (Uptown Baby) – Sony
  Nas – Halftime (Album Version) – Sony
  Blahzay Blahzay – Danger – Polygram
  M.O.P. – Ante Up (Robbin Hoodz Theory – Explicit Mix) – Loud
  QB Finest Ft Nas & Bravehearts – Oochie Wally – Sony
  Ol' Dirty Bastard – Shimmy Shimmy Ya – WEA
  Crooklyn Clan – The Franklinz (Dirty Mix) – AV8
  Crooklyn Clan – Thug Anthem – AV8
  Mystikal – Shake Ya Ass (LP Version) – Zomba
  KRS-One – Sound Of Da Police – Zomba
  Boogie Down Productions – South Bronx – B Boy
  Eric B & Rakim – Eric B. Is President (Album Version) – UMG
  Special Ed – I Got It Made – Profile
  Black Sheep – The Choice Is Yours (Album Version) – UMG
  Showbiz & A.G. – Party Groove – London
  The 45 King – The 900 Number – Tuff City
  A Tribe Called Quest – Scenario – Zomba
  Run DMC – Peter Piper – Arista
  Run DMC – Walk This Way – Arista
  Slick Rick – Mona Lisa – UMG
  Rob Base & DJ EZ Rock – It Takes Two – Arista
  Cheryl Lynn – Got To Be Real – Sony
  Sugarhill Gang – Rapper's Delight – Sanctuary
  Grandmaster Flash & Melle Mel – White Lines – Castle
  Pete Rock & C.L. Smooth – The Creator – WEA
  Chubb Rock – Treat 'Em Right – Select

References

External links
Fabric: FabricLive.14

2004 compilation albums